Puig de la Mola is a mountain in the Garraf Massif, Catalonia, Spain. It has an elevation of 533 metres above sea level.

It is located between the municipalities of Avinyonet del Penedès, Olesa de Bonesvalls (Alt Penedès), Begues (Baix Llobregat) and Olivella (Garraf)

See also
Mountains of Catalonia

References

Mountains of Catalonia